Zinc finger protein 692 is a protein that in humans is encoded by the ZNF692 gene.

References

External links 
 PDBe-KB provides an overview of all the structure information available in the PDB for Human Zinc finger protein 692

Further reading